Zvi Jagendorf (Hebrew צבי יגנדורף; born February 18, 1936, in Vienna, Austria) is an Israeli writer. Together with his parents, Zvi Jagendorf managed to escape Austria to the United Kingdom in 1939. He studied English literature at Oxford University and emigrated to Israel after graduating in 1958. Jagendorf taught English literature and theater studies at the Hebrew University of Jerusalem. He has also appeared as an actor, theater critic and translator, but he became known to a larger audience as the author of numerous short stories and two novels. His autobiographically inspired 2001 debut novel, Wolfy and the Strudelbakers was nominated for the Booker Prize and the Wingate Prize and awarded the Sagittarius Prize. 

His second novel, Coming Soon: The Flood, is set in 1960s Jerusalem.

References

1936 births
Living people
20th-century American novelists
20th-century American short story writers
21st-century American Jews
21st-century American novelists
21st-century American short story writers
American people of Austrian-Jewish descent
Austrian emigrants to the United States
Jewish American novelists
Jewish emigrants from Austria to the United Kingdom after the Anschluss